Free Talk Studio: Mari no Kimama na O-Shaberi, a Japan-only radio DJ simulation game for Sega Saturn, was released in 1997 by Media Entertainment. Two different packaging editions were produced, a blue case and a red case. The blue case contains three cards featuring the lead voice actress from the game, Mariko Kōda, alongside the characters she played, Mari Kousaka and Natsumi Kawai; the red case contains a photo booklet which also focuses on her. A PlayStation version of this title also exists, while there are no bonus packaging variants such as in the Saturn version, there are two releases, the difference being that one is on the Best of the Best label.

During the game, the player takes on the role of Mari Kousaka, who was just hired as a DJ. There is then a choice of three out of four guests to interview: Aya Isokawa, a comedian (played by voice actress Aya Hisakawa); Nanacy Hiruma, an eccentric artist; Miyu Enjoji, and Kururi Shibasaki. Do well enough throughout these interviews by picking from multiple choice dialogues, and go on to interview superstar Natsumi Kawai. The ultimate goal is to convince her to sing a jingle for Mari's radio show.

Summary
The game is set up much like a dating sim. The main gameplay comes from multiple choice selections, and most endings involve whichever character the player held the strongest interview with. The Miyu Enjoji ending even includes a lingerie scene. As all of the guests are female, this could almost classify as a GxG sim, though the male manager and executive endings make this barely an all pairings title.

1997 video games
Sega Saturn games
PlayStation (console) games